William Ruiz is a playwright, poet, and actor from the Bronx. Born and raised on the Lower East Side of Manhattan, William (a.k.a. Ninja) is a core member of Universes (poetic theatre ensemble).

Theater Credits Include
Ti-Jean Blues
Waiting for Gordo
Slanguage
Ameriville
Party People
UniSon

Awards/Affiliations
2008 Jazz at Lincoln Center Rhythm Road Tour; 
Bard College, BA ’98.  
Publications: UNIVERSES-THE BIG BANG (2017 release- TCG Books);

References

External links
Official site

People from the Bronx
Living people
Year of birth missing (living people)